Green Valley is a village in Tazewell County, Illinois, United States. It is south of Pekin near the county border along Illinois State Route 29. The population was 709 at the 2010 census

Geography
Green Valley is located at  (40.408529, -89.644067).

Demographics

As of the census of 2000, there were 728 people, 262 households, and 205 families residing in the village. The racial makeup of the village was 99.04% White, 0.14% African American, 0.27% Native American, 0.27% Asian, and 0.27% from two or more races. Hispanic or Latino of any race were 0.69% of the population.

There were 262 households, out of which 41.2% had children under the age of 18 living with them, 66.8% were married couples living together, 8.0% had a female householder with no husband present, and 21.4% were non-families. 19.8% of all households were made up of individuals, and 9.9% had someone living alone who was 65 years of age or older. The average household size was 2.73 and the average family size was 3.13.

In the village, the population was spread out, with 29.4% under the age of 18, 9.1% from 18 to 24, 28.8% from 25 to 44, 20.6% from 45 to 64, and 12.1% who were 65 years of age or older. The median age was 34 years. For every 100 females, there were 83.8 males. For every 100 females age 18 and over, there were 88.3 males.

The median income for a household in the village was $40,833, and the median income for a family was $50,268. Males had a median income of $39,196 versus $22,353 for females. The per capita income for the village was $17,830. About 5.4% of families and 7.5% of the population were below the poverty line, including 5.8% of those under age 18 and 8.6% of those age 65 or over.

References

Villages in Tazewell County, Illinois
Villages in Illinois